Savera is a Bollywood drama film directed by Virendra C. Desai. It was released in 1942.

Cast
 Shobhna Samarth
 Nirmala Devi
 Kesari
 Yakub Khan
 Mehboob Khan

References

External links
 

1942 films
1940s Hindi-language films
Indian black-and-white films